Saccopharynx is a genus of deep-sea eels with large mouths, distensible stomachs and long, scaleless bodies. Commonly, these fish are called gulpers or gulper eels. It is the only genus in the family Saccopharyngidae, and is part of the derived lineage of the "saccopharyngiforms," which includes other mid-water eel species. The name is from Latin saccus meaning "sack" and Greek φάρυγξ, pharynx.

They are generally black in color, and can grow to lengths of 2 m (6.5 feet). Their tails are tipped by a luminous, bulb-shaped organ. The exact purpose of this organ is unknown, although it is most likely used as a lure, similar to the esca of anglerfish.

Species 
The genus has ten recognized species:
 Saccopharynx ampullaceus Harwood, 1827 (Gulper eel)
 Saccopharynx berteli Tighe & J. G. Nielsen, 2000
 Saccopharynx harrisoni Beebe, 1932
 Saccopharynx hjorti Bertin, 1938
 Saccopharynx lavenbergi J. G. Nielsen & Bertelsen, 1985
 Saccopharynx paucovertebratis J. G. Nielsen & Bertelsen, 1985
 Saccopharynx ramosus J. G. Nielsen & Bertelsen, 1985
 Saccopharynx schmidti Bertin, 1934 (Whiptail gulper)
 Saccopharynx thalassa J. G. Nielsen & Bertelsen, 1985
 Saccopharynx trilobatus J. G. Nielsen & Bertelsen, 1985

References

Saccopharyngidae
Ray-finned fish genera
Marine fish genera
Deep sea fish
Taxa named by Samuel L. Mitchill